Menachem Kipnis (born 1878 in Ushomyr, Volhynia, d. 1942 in the Warsaw Ghetto), was a singer, critic, and photographer. He was also an ethnographer of Yiddish songs. As a tenor, Kipnis was a common performer of Yiddish songs.  He died from a stroke in 1942.

Menachem Kipnis' father was an educated cantor. From the age of eight, Menachem Kipnis lived with his older brother, who was also a cantor and is the father of the writer Levin Kipnis. Menachem Kipnis received a traditional Jewish education and sang with his brother in the choir of the Chernobyl synagogue. In this he impressed with his beautiful alto voice.

Publications 

 1918: Zekhtsik folks-lider (Sixty Folk Songs)
 1925: Akhtsik folks-lider (Eighty Folk Songs)
 1930: Khelemer mayses (Chelm Stories)

References

External links 
 Free song lyrics in Yiddish and scores from the Folks-Lider-Samlung by Menachem Kipnis
 Works by Menachem Kipnis in digital library Polona

1878 births
1942 deaths
People from Volhynian Governorate
Jews from the Russian Empire
Ukrainian Jews
Polish photographers
Ethnographers
Yiddish-language singers
People who died in the Warsaw Ghetto